Ervin Rustemagić (born 1952) is a Bosnian comic book publisher, distributor, and rights agent, born in Sarajevo, Bosnia and Herzegovina, and currently based in Slovenia. He is the founder of Strip Art Features (SAF) in Sarajevo, as well as the magazine Strip Art of the former Yugoslavia. Rustemagić (through Strip Art Features) represents artists such as Hermann Huppen, Bane Kerac, and Joe Kubert.

His personal plight, documented by telefax during the war in Bosnia and Herzegovina, was the theme of the award-winning nonfiction graphic novel Fax from Sarajevo by Joe Kubert.

Biography 
Rustemagić founded Strip Art in 1971 at the age of 17, and founded Strip Art Features in 1972.

With the beginning of the Bosnian War in early 1992, Rustemagić's home and the SAF offices in the Sarajevo suburb of Ilidža were destroyed. More than 14,000 pieces of original art were lost in the flames, including pieces by Americans Hal Foster, Doug Wildey, Joe Kubert, Warren Tufts, Sergio Aragonés, George McManus, Alex Raymond, Charles M. Schulz, Mort Walker, John Prentice, Al Williamson, Gordon Bess, and Bud Sagendorf; works by Argentinean artists such as Alberto Breccia and Carlos Meglia; and pieces by European creators like André Franquin, Maurice Tillieux, Hermann, Martin Lodewijk, Philippe Bercovici, Giorgio Cavazzano, John Burns, and Ferdinando Tacconi.

Rustemagić was trapped in the war-torn city with his family, sheltering in an apartment building in Dobrinja. Some months later, in October 1992, the family moved locations to the Sarajevo Holiday Inn, at that point mostly occupied by foreign journalists and constantly under fire. Thanks to help from European publishers and artists, in late 1993 Rustemagić gained journalist accreditation, enabling him to escape Bosnia and Herzegovina. After more than a month fruitlessly attempting to get his family out of the country, he was given Slovenian citizenship, which immediately transferred to his family. In September 1993 the family was reunited in Split, Croatia. This was the story told in Fax from Sarajevo.

At some point during the siege, Rustemagić's mother was killed when a hospital where she had been taken due to illness was captured by Serbian troops.

Rustemagić co-founded Platinum Studios in January 1997 with Scott Mitchell Rosenberg. As part of the arrangement, Platinum Studios acquired the film and television rights to Dylan Dog and Jeremiah, both of which had previously been licensed by Rustemagić. Jeremiah was eventually adapted into a science-fiction TV series which ran on Showtime from 2002 to 2004; Rustemagić was given the title of executive producer of the series. Dylan Dog was the source material for the 2010 film Dylan Dog: Dead of Night. Rustemagić left Platinum Studios in 2000, returning to full-time work at Strip Art Features.

Personal life 
Rustemagic is an ethnic Bosniak of Jewish background, though his family was not religious. He and his wife Edina have two children, Maja (born July 20, 1982) and Edvin (born c. 1987).

References

External links 
 Strip Art Features official site
 Interview with Ervin Rustemagić, Dark Horse Comics

1952 births
Living people
Bosnia and Herzegovina comics writers
Businesspeople from Sarajevo
Bosnia and Herzegovina comics artists
Comic book company founders
Comic book publishers (people)